Lieutenant General Charles Lloyd  was a General Officer in the South African Army. He died on 20 December 2014.

Early life

Military career 

General Lloyd commanded the South West African Territorial Force in the 1980s.

He was a major proponent of the "Winning the Hearts and Minds" (WHAM) strategy of counter-insurgency. He was also a key part of the development of the National Security Management System (NSMS) under Prime Minister P.W. Botha and served as secretary of the State Security Council from 1988 to 1990. He stated that the NSMS was concerned with three areas: the government, (for self-criticism and the correction of short comings), the enemy (to "command, coerce and eliminate") and the masses (whose support had to be won through communication and education). As secretary of the SSC, he essentially drove the State Security apparatus on a day-to-day basis.

He commanded Far North Command before handing over to Gen Georg Meiring in 1986.

He was in overall command of Operation Protea.
General Roland de Vries later had this to say about General Lloyd:
“From my point of view, the most important military leaders at that time were General Constand Viljoen, the Chief of the SADF and the founding father, so to speak, of 61 Mech; Lieutenant General Johannes Geldenhuys, Chief of the Army; and Major General Charles Lloyd, General Officer Commanding SWATF. It was my good fortune that all three were inspirational commanders who had a marked influence on shaping and building the best army in Africa”.

Awards and decorations

See also
 South African Army
 South African Border War

References 

 

Afrikaner people
South African Army generals
South African military personnel of the Border War
2014 deaths